Drug-induced nonautoimmune hemolytic anemia is a form of hemolytic anemia.

Non-immune drug induced hemolysis can occur via oxidative mechanisms.  This is particularly likely to occur when there is an enzyme deficiency in the antioxidant defense system of the red blood cells.  An example is where antimalarial oxidant drugs like primaquine damage red blood cells in Glucose-6-phosphate dehydrogenase deficiency in which the red blood cells are more susceptible to oxidative stress due to reduced NADPH production consequent to the enzyme
deficiency.

Some drugs cause RBC (red blood cell) lysis even in normal individuals.  These include dapsone and sulfasalazine.

Non-immune drug-induced hemolysis can also arise from drug-induced damage to cell volume control mechanisms; for example drugs can directly or indirectly impair regulatory volume decrease mechanisms, which become activated during hypotonic RBC swelling to return the cell to a normal volume. The consequence of the drugs actions are irreversible cell swelling and lysis (e.g. ouabain at very high doses).

See also
 List of circulatory system conditions

References

External links 

Acquired hemolytic anemia
Drug-induced diseases